Marcantonio Gozzadini (1574 – 1 September 1623) was an Italian Roman Catholic Cardinal.

Biography
He was born in Bologna into a patrician family. He was a cousin of Pope Gregory XV.

He studied canon and civil law at the University of Bologna and started both his judicial and ecclesiastical career there, but in 1616 he was transferred to Rome as advocate of the Roman Curia.

Gozzadini was created cardinal priest in the consistory of 21 July 1621 and opted for the title of Sant'Eusebio. He was also made Commander of the Sovereign Military Order of Malta by Pope Gregory XV.

In 1621 he was elected Bishop of Tivoli and opted for the title of S. Agata in Suburra on 23 May 1623. On 13 March 1622 he was consecrated bishop by Ludovico Ludovisi, Archbishop of Bologna, with Galeazzo Sanvitale, Archbishop Emeritus of Bari-Canos, and Ulpiano Volpi, Bishop of Novara, serving as co-consecrators. On 7 June 1623 he was transferred to the Diocese of Faenza. Gozzadini participated in the Papal conclave of 1623.

He died in Rome in 1623.

Episcopal succession

References

1574 births
1623 deaths
Clergy from Bologna
17th-century Italian cardinals
Bishops of Faenza
Bishops of Tivoli
17th-century Italian Roman Catholic bishops
Cardinal-nephews